SNA or Sna may refer to:

Organizations
 Novinite.com (Sofia News Agency), Bulgaria's largest English-language news provider
 Shanni Nationalities Army
 Singapore National Academy, a school in Surabaya, Indonesia
 Sky News Australia, an Australian 24-hour news channel
 Snap-on, an American tool company (NYSE: SNA)
 Social-National Assembly, a Ukrainian far-right political group
 Somali National Army, the land based branch of the Somali Armed Forces
 Somali National Alliance, a faction in the Somali Civil War from 1992
 Sangeet Natak Akademi, the national level academy for performing arts in India
 Suzhou North America High School
 Stellantis North America, an automobile manufacturer
 Syrian National Army, also known as the Turkish-backed Free Syrian Army

Science and technology
 Social network analysis
 Systems Network Architecture, an IBM computer networking protocol suite
 Elderberry lectin, by lectin symbol
 Spherical Nucleic Acids
 .sna, snapshot file used in ZX Spectrum emulation
 SNA (computer graphics), a graphics acceleration architecture
 Sympathetic nervous system activity
 Strange nonchaotic attractor
 Scalar network analyzer (electrical)

Transport
 John Wayne Airport, by IATA airport code
 Sandal and Agbrigg railway station, by National Rail station code
 Santa Ana (Amtrak station), by Amtrak station code
 Skynet Asia, a Japanese airline

Other uses
 System of National Accounts
 Student Naval Aviator, training to be a United States Naval Aviator
 Special needs assistant
 sna, the ISO 639 code of the Shona language
 Significant Natural Area, a classification in the Resource Management Act in New Zealand